Jean Levaillant (9 October 1794 – 1871) was a French general.

1794 births
1871 deaths
French generals